This article lists the representative offices of Republic of Artsakh. Artsakh is a de facto independent republic in the Caucasus region that remains recognized only by three other states with limited recognition, all being members of the Community for Democracy and Rights of Nations. However, all countries recognize Artsakh as part of Azerbaijan - nevertheless, it maintains several representative offices abroad.

North America
  
 Washington D.C. (Representative Office)
 Also accredited to

Europe
 
 Yerevan (Representative Office)
 
 Paris (Representative Office)

 
 Berlin (Representative Office) 
 
 Moscow (Representative Office)

Asia
 
 Beirut (Representative Office, responsible also for the rest of the Middle East countries)

Oceania
 
 Sydney (Representative Office)

See also
 Foreign relations of Artsakh
 List of diplomatic missions of Armenia
 Political status of Artsakh
 Visa policy of Artsakh

References

External links
 Permanent Representations of Nagorno-Karabakh Republic

Foreign relations of the Republic of Artsakh
Artsakh
Republic of Artsakh-related lists